John Greenford was an English Member of Parliament for Winchelsea 1449–1450.

References

Year of birth missing
Year of death missing
15th-century English people
English MPs November 1449
People from Winchelsea
Place of birth missing
Place of death missing